Katie Alison McCabe (born 21 September 1995) is an Irish footballer who plays for FA WSL club Arsenal and serves as captain of the Republic of Ireland national team.

As a teenager, she won the Irish Women's National League title twice and the FAI Women's Cup three times with Raheny United before signing with Arsenal in 2015. With Arsenal, she has since won the Women's FA Cup in 2016, the 2018–19 FA WSL league title, and was named to the PFA Team of the Year for 2021. After earning her first Ireland cap in 2015, she was named the country's captain in 2017, the youngest captain in the history of the team.

Club career

Youth career 
Growing up, McCabe played on boys' youth teams for Kilnamanagh AFC and Crumlin United F.C. At the age of 10, she joined her first girls' team in Templeogue, playing for both the girls' team and the boys' team until she turned 13. Her favourite player as a kid was Damien Duff. During secondary school, she also played Gaelic football and basketball.

Women's National League: 2011–2015 
When the Women's National League (WNL) was formed in 2011, McCabe signed with Raheny United. She had previously trained with the club, but league regulations prevented her from signing a contract until she turned 16. She represented the club in the competition's first season. Over the next three seasons she won two league titles and three consecutive FAI Women's Cups with "The Pandas". She also represented the club in the UEFA Women's Champions League.

She missed four months of the 2013–14 season with a broken leg. That year, she had also been recruited by Florida State University to play for the Florida State Seminoles women's soccer team in the United States, but the move collapsed due to her injury.

In 2014–15 McCabe scored 23 WNL goals for Raheny, two behind top scorer Áine O'Gorman of UCD Waves. In November 2014, she scored the opening goal for Raheny in the FAI Women's Cup final, from a 35-yard free kick, winning her second FAI Cup with the club.

For the 2015–16 season, McCabe remained with the club in their new guise as Shelbourne Ladies.

Arsenal: 2015–2017 

In December 2015 she signed for London club Arsenal Ladies, rejecting competing offers from Glasgow City, Chelsea and Manchester City.

Glasgow City: 2017 (loan) 
After struggling with injuries and a lack of first-team playing time in her first year with Arsenal, she joined Glasgow City on loan in August 2017, for the second half of the Scottish Women's Premier League season. She would help lead Glasgow to the Scottish title as well as making a handful of appearances in the UEFA Women's Champions League.

Arsenal: 2017–present 
Upon returning to Arsenal after the end of her loan, new Arsenal manager Joe Montemurro shifted her to the left-full back position.

In the 2018–19 season, she helped lead Arsenal to the FA WSL title, playing the most minutes of any player on the squad. On 26 March 2019, she signed an extension with Arsenal. Five days later, in one of the last matches of the year, she scored a crucial game-winning goal against Birmingham, keeping Arsenal one point clear on top of the league table.

She scored 5 goals and picked up 12 assists during the 2020–21 FA WSL season as Arsenal finished in third, tied for first in the league in assists and being named to the PFA Team of the Year. In December 2020, she made her 100th appearance for Arsenal in a 4-0 victory over Everton, picking up an assist from the corner on a goal by Jen Beattie. Later that month, she was involved in a COVID-19-related controversy after posting a picture of herself on a beach in Dubai despite a travel ban for Tier 4 residents in London. She stated that she had gone to Dubai for a business meeting with her agent. She did not receive any disciplinary sanctions from the FA for the controversy.

Ahead of the 2021–22 FA WSL season, she signed a new long-term contract with Arsenal.

International career
At the 2014 UEFA Women's Under-19 Championship, McCabe featured as Ireland won their group, before crashing 4–0 to a Vivianne Miedema-inspired Netherlands in the semi-final.

In March 2015 national coach Susan Ronan gave McCabe a senior debut against Hungary at the 2015 Istria Cup, a 1–1 draw. A quad injury kept McCabe out of Ireland's 3–0 UEFA Women's Euro 2017 qualifying defeat by Spain on 26 November 2015 at Tallaght Stadium, Dublin. At the 2016 Cyprus Cup, McCabe scored her first international goal to secure a 1–1 draw with Italy.

McCabe featured in Ronan's squad for the UEFA Women's Euro qualifying stage, making seven appearances in total. In August 2017, new national team coach Colin Bell appointed 21-year-old McCabe as the Ireland captain, the youngest captain in the history of the team.

In April 2021, she earned her 50th cap for Ireland against Belgium. In September 2021, the FAI announced that it would implement equal pay for its men's and women's national teams, after negotiations led by McCabe and men's captain Séamus Coleman.

International goals

Personal life
McCabe has 10 siblings, including Gary McCabe, who played in the League of Ireland Premier Division from 2007 to 2018.

She is openly lesbian. In June 2019, she revealed that she is in a relationship with fellow player Ruesha Littlejohn and that women's association football is very accepting of LGBT people.

Honours
Raheny United
 Women's National League: 2012–13, 2013–14
 FAI Women's Cup: 2012, 2013, 2014
 WNL Cup: 2015

Arsenal
FA Women's Cup: 2015–16
FA Women's Super League: 2018–19

 FA Women's League Cup: 2022–23

Individual
 Arsenal Player of the Year: 2021–22
 Ireland Player of the Year: 2022
 FA Women's Super League Goal of the Month: October 2021

References

External links

Katie McCabe at Football Association of Ireland (FAI)

1995 births
Living people
Republic of Ireland women's association footballers
Republic of Ireland women's international footballers
Arsenal W.F.C. players
Women's Super League players
Association footballers from Dublin (city)
Republic of Ireland expatriate association footballers
Expatriate women's footballers in England
Raheny United F.C. players
Women's National League (Ireland) players
St Francis L.F.C. players
Shelbourne F.C. (women) players
Glasgow City F.C. players
Women's association football wingers
LGBT association football players
Irish LGBT sportspeople
Lesbian sportswomen
Republic of Ireland women's youth international footballers